Kim Won-jung ( born December 18, 1984 in Seoul) is a retired Korean professional ice hockey right winger currently playing for Anyang Halla of the Asia League Ice Hockey (ALIH).

References

External links

1984 births
Living people
Handball players from Seoul
South Korean ice hockey right wingers
HL Anyang players
Olympic ice hockey players of South Korea
Ice hockey players at the 2018 Winter Olympics
Ice hockey players at the 2011 Asian Winter Games
Ice hockey players at the 2017 Asian Winter Games
Medalists at the 2011 Asian Winter Games
Medalists at the 2017 Asian Winter Games
Asian Games silver medalists for South Korea
Asian Games bronze medalists for South Korea
Asian Games medalists in ice hockey